Helen Hedges is a New Zealand education academic. As of 2018 she is a full professor at the University of Auckland.

Academic career
After a 2002 MEd Early Years thesis titled  'Subject content knowledge in early childhood curriculum and pedagogy'  and a 2007 PhD titled  'Funds of knowledge in early childhood communities of inquiry'  undertaken at Massey University, Hedges published prolifically. She joined the University of Auckland in 2003, rising to full professor in 2018.

Selected works

References

External links
 

Living people
New Zealand women academics
Year of birth missing (living people)
Massey University alumni
Academic staff of the University of Auckland
New Zealand educational theorists
New Zealand women writers